Diadegma claripenne is a wasp first described by Carl Gustaf Thomson in 1887.
No subspecies are listed.

References

claripenne
Insects described in 1887